Zak Bucia   is a professional American mixed martial artist fighting out of San Francisco, California.

He is the current WSCA (Wyoming Sports Combat Association) Welterweight Champion, as well as the current Dragon House MMA Welterweight Champion.

Championships and accomplishments
Dragon House
Dragon House Welterweight Championship (One time, current)
Wyoming Sports Combat Association
WSCA Welterweight Championship (One time, current)

Mixed martial arts record

|-
| Loss
| align=center| 19–14
| Mikey England
|TKO (punches)
|FAC 12: Lookin' For a Fight
|
|align=center|2
|align=center|4:17
|Independence, Missouri, United States
| 
|-
| Win
| align=center| 19–13
| Marcus Andrusia
|Submission (kimura)
|Apex FC 4
|
|align=center|1
|align=center|0:47
|Kansas City, Missouri, United States
| 
|-
| Loss
| align=center| 18–13
| Austin Jones
| Decision (unanimous)
|Apex FC 2
|
|align=center|3
|align=center|5:00
|Kansas City, Missouri, United States
| 
|-
| Loss
| align=center| 18–12
| Jason Witt
| Decision (unanimous)
|Fighting Alliance Championship 2
|
|align=center|3
|align=center|5:00
|Independence, Missouri, United States
| 
|-
| Loss
| align=center| 18–11
| Chris Harris
| Decision (split)
| Evolution Fighting Championship 10
| 
| align=center| 5
| align=center| 5:00
| Ridgefield, Washington, United States
| 
|-
| Loss
| align=center| 18–10
| Derek Anderson
|Decision (unanimous)
|Bellator 197
|
|align=center|3
|align=center|5:00
|St. Charles, Missouri, United States
|
|-
| Loss
| align=center| 18–9
| Neiman Gracie
| Submission (neck crank)
|Bellator 185
|
|align=center|2
|align=center|2:27
|Uncasville, Connecticut, United States
| 
|-
| Win
| align=center| 18–8
| Aaron Highfill
| Submission (armbar)
|Shamrock FC 295
| 
| align=center| 4
| align=center| 3:03
| St. Louis, Missouri, United States
| 
|-
| Win
| align=center| 17–8
| Bobby Voelker
| Decision (unanimous)
| Shamrock FC 289
| 
| align=center| 3
| align=center| 5:00
| Kansas City, Missouri, United States
|
|-
| Win
| align=center| 16–8
| Adam Meredith
| TKO (punches)
| Shamrock FC 280
| 
| align=center| 1
| align=center| 4:37
| Kansas City, Missouri, United States
| 
|-
| Loss
| align=center| 15–8
| Jake Lindsey
|TKO (knee and punches)
|VFC 50
|
|align=center|3
|align=center|1:26
|Topeka, Kansas, United States
| 
|-
| Loss
| align=center| 15–7
| Jason Novelli
| Decision (unanimous)
| Titan F.C. 37: Dos Santos vs. Simon
| 
| align=center| 3
| align=center| 5:00
| Ridgefield, Washington, United States
| 
|-
| Win
| align=center| 15–6
| Rasul Shohalov
| Submission (Rear-Naked Choke)
| Titan F.C. 35: Healy vs. Hawn
| 
| align=center| 2
| align=center| 2:10
| Ridgefield, Washington, United States
| 
|-
| Win
| align=center| 14-6
| Jose Landi-Jons
| KO (Punches)
| Titan F.C. 34: Healy vs. Edwards
| 
| align=center| 2
| align=center| 0:47
| Kansas City, Missouri, United States
| 
|-
| Win
| align=center| 13-6
| Robert Washington
| KO (Punch)
| Shamrock Promotions: Charged
| 
| align=center| 1
| align=center| 4:20
| Kansas City, Missouri, United States
| 
|-
| Win
| align=center| 12–6
| Hugh Pulley
| Decision (unanimous)
| Shamrock Promotions: Destruction
| 
| align=center| 3
| align=center| 5:00
| Kansas City, Missouri, United States
| 
|-
| Loss
| align=center| 11–6
| Rudy Bears
| Decision (unanimous)
| Shamrock Promotions: Impact
| 
| align=center| 3
| align=center| 5:00
| Kansas City, Missouri, United States
| 
|-
| Win
| align=center| 11–5
| Mauricio Alonso
| Submission (armbar)
| Dragon House 16
| 
| align=center| 4
| align=center| 1:55
| San Francisco, California, United States
| 
|-
| Loss
| align=center| 10–5
| Billy Evangelista
| Decision (unanimous)
| UPC Unlimited - Up & Comers 15
| 
| align=center| 3
| align=center| 5:00
| Fresno, California, United States
| 
|-
| Win
| align=center| 10–4
| Wayne Phillips
| Submission (rear-naked choke)
| Dragon House 11 
| 
| align=center| 2
| align=center| 2:58 
| Oakland, California, United States
| 
|-
| Win
| align=center| 9–4
| Aaron Hedrick
| Submission (rear-naked choke)
| KOTC All In 
| 
| align=center| 1
| align=center| 3:36 
| Oroville, California, United States
| 
|-
| Win
| align=center| 8–4
| Nickolas Christy
| TKO (punches)
| KOTC: Shockwave
| 
| align=center| 2
| align=center| 1:39 
| Oroville, California, United States
| 
|-
| Win
| align=center| 7–4
| Christopher Ortega
| Submission (armbar)
| Proving Grounds III 
| 
| align=center| 1
| align=center| 0:58 
| Laramie, Wyoming, United States
| 
|-
| Loss
| align=center| 6–4
| Danny Davis Jr. 
| Decision (unanimous) 
| MMA Xplosion: Vianna vs. Lacy 
| 
| align=center| 3
| align=center| 5:00
| Las Vegas, Nevada, United States
| 
|-
| Win
| align=center| 6–3
| Sam Neeley 
| Submission (choke) 
| GC: Gladiator Challenge at the Win-River Casino
|  
| align=center| 1
| align=center| 2:46
| San Francisco, California, United States
| 
|-
| Loss
| align=center| 5–3
| James Terry 
| TKO (head kick and punches) 
| Strikeforce: Carano vs. Cyborg 
|  
| align=center| 1
| align=center| 1:23
| San Jose, California, United States
| 
|-
| Win
| align=center| 5–2
| Daniel McWilliams 
| TKO (punches) 
| CCFC: Rush
|  
| align=center| 1
| align=center| 1:20
| Santa Rosa, California, United States
| 
|-
| Win
| align=center| 4–2
| Tramain Smith 
| Submission (rear naked choke) 
| Gladiator Challenge: Put Up or Shut Up
|  
| align=center| 1
| align=center| 2:26
| San Francisco, California, United States
| 
|-
| Loss
| align=center| 3–2
| James Terry 
| Decision (unanimous) 
| Strikeforce: Shamrock vs. Diaz 
| 
| align=center| 3
| align=center| 5:00
| San Jose, California, United States
| 
|-
| Win
| align=center| 3–1
| Adam Steel 
| Submission (guillotine choke) 
| Strikeforce: Destruction
|  
| align=center| 1
| align=center| 0:35
| San Jose, California, United States
| 
|-
| Win
| align=center| 2–1
| Adam Albright 
| Decision (split) 
| GC 80: Summer Showdown
|  
| align=center| 3
| align=center| 5:00
| San Francisco, California, United States
| 
|-
| Win
| align=center| 1–1
| Justin Holdaas 
| Submission (punches) 
| GC 75: Erin-Go-Brawl
|  
| align=center| 1
| align=center| 1:06
| San Francisco, California, United States
| 
|-
| Loss
| align=center| 0–1
| Pat Minihan 
| Decision (unanimous) 
| GC 66: Battle Ground
|  
| align=center| 3
| align=center| 5:00
| San Francisco, California, United States
|

References

External links
 

American male mixed martial artists
Welterweight mixed martial artists
Living people
Year of birth missing (living people)